The 2020–21 WHL season was the 55th season of the Western Hockey League (WHL). The season began on February 26 and ended on May 12.

Due to the ongoing COVID-19 pandemic and a late start, the season was shortened from 68 to 24 games, and the WHL officially termed the season as a "developmental season". Teams played within their respective divisions only: the Central Division consisted exclusively of Alberta-based teams, the U.S. Division played exclusively in Washington state, all B.C.-based teams played from either Sandman Centre or Prospera Place in Kamloops and Kelowna, British Columbia, and all East Division games were played at Brandt Centre in Regina, Saskatchewan. 

In Alberta due to protocols agreed upon by the league, a five-day period was required between games involving different opponents. Therefore, all Central Division games were scheduled as home-and-home series on weekends only, and thus no team was scheduled to play more than one opponent per-week.

On April 19, citing logistical issues and interprovincial travel restrictions, and following the cancellation of the 2021 Memorial Cup, the WHL announced that it had cancelled the playoffs. Therefore, no league champion was declared for the second season in a row.

Standings

Note: GP = Games played; W = Wins; L = Losses; OTL = Overtime losses; SL = Shootout losses; GF = Goals for; GA = Goals against; PTS = Points; x = clinched playoff berth; y = clinched division title; z = clinched conference title

Statistics

Scoring leaders 

Players are listed by points, then goals.

Note: GP = Games played; G = Goals; A = Assists; Pts. = Points; PIM = Penalty minutes

Goaltenders 
These are the goaltenders that lead the league in GAA that have played at least 420 minutes.

Note: GP = Games played; Mins = Minutes played; W = Wins; L = Losses; OTL = Overtime losses; SOL = Shootout Losses; SO = Shutouts; GAA = Goals against average; Sv% = Save percentage

WHL awards

See also 
 List of WHL seasons
 2020–21 OHL season
 2020–21 QMJHL season
 2020 in ice hockey

References

External links 
 Official website of the Western Hockey League
 Official website of the Canadian Hockey League
 Official website of the MasterCard Memorial Cup
 Official website of the Subway Super Series

Western Hockey League seasons
WHL
WHL
WHL